The national debt of Pakistan, or simply Pakistani debt, is the total public debt, or unpaid borrowed funds carried by the Government of Pakistan, which includes measurement as the face value of the currently outstanding treasury bills (T-bills) that have been issued by the federal government. 

The terms 'budget deficit' and 'national surplus' usually refer to the federal government budget balance from year to year, not the cumulative amount of debt. A deficit year increases the debt, while a surplus year decreases the debt as more money is received than spent.

History
PPP government was dependent on domestic and International lending to meet the needs of the government expenditures. Total debt increased to 64 percent of the GDP but external debt as a percentage of GDP decreased from 29.5 percent to 23.4 percent.

After 2013 Pakistani general election, Nawaz Sharif came to power.

After 2018 Pakistani general elections, Imran Khan came to power.

Current debt
As of October 2021, Total Public Debt and Liabilities of Pakistan is estimated to be about / which is 89 percent of gross domestic product (GDP) of Pakistan.

About 15% of the external debt which is estimated around  (6.15% of GDP) is owed to China due to China-Pakistan Economic Corridor. 

Pakistan is facing a "huge external financing gap" of $4 billion, with China, Saudi Arabia, and the UAE expected to provide additional support. The IMF is seeking to fund its program and secure $7 billion for debt repayment, current account deficit financing, and increasing foreign exchange reserves. The talks between Pakistan and the IMF were delayed due to concerns over the credibility of the government's assurances and the reliability of foreign loans. Despite some agreement on reform actions and measures, there are still outstanding issues and the IMF has expressed concerns about the government's ability to fulfill past commitments.

Foreign Minister Bilawal Bhutto Zardari of Pakistan asked the International Monetary Fund to soften the conditions of its bailout package to help the country protect flood victims from rising prices.

IMF urged Pakistan to hike its general sales tax rate to at least 18% in an effort to bolster revenue. The country's debt servicing costs are expected to surge to a high of Rs5.2 trillion in the current fiscal year. The IMF demand was made as the government shared its revised macroeconomic projections showing inflation rising to 29% and economic growth rate slowing to 1.5%, which will lead to higher unemployment and poverty in the country.

References

 
Economy of Pakistan
Pakistani budgets